Barium iodide is an inorganic compound with the formula BaI2.  The compound exists as an anhydrous and a hydrate (BaI2(H2O)2), both of which are white solids. When heated, hydrated barium iodide converts to the anhydrous salt. The hydrated form is freely soluble in water, ethanol, and acetone.

Structure
The structure of the anhydrous form resembles that of lead(II) chloride with each Ba center bound to nine iodide ligands and has a crystalline packing structure that is quite similar to BaCl2.

Reactions
Anhydrous BaI2 can be prepared by treating Ba metal with 1,2-diiodoethane in ether.

BaI2 reacts with alkyl potassium compounds to form organobarium compounds.

BaI2 can be reduced with lithium biphenyl, to give a highly active form of barium metal.

Safety
Like other soluble salts of barium, barium iodide is toxic.

References

Iodides
Barium compounds
Alkaline earth metal halides